Rajasuya is a Śrauta ritual of the Vedic religion. It is ceremony that marks a consecration of a king. According to the Puranas, it refers to a great sacrifice performed by a Chakravarti - universal monarch, in which the tributary princes may also take part, at the time of his coronation, as a mark of his undisputed sovereignty.

Description
The rajasuya is associated with the consecration of a king and is prescribed as a means to establish a king's sovereignty. It is described in the Taittiriya corpus, including Apastamba Srauta Sutra 18.8–25.22. It involves soma pressing, a chariot drive, the king shooting arrows from his bow, and a brief "cattle raid". The newly anointed king seizes cattle belonging to his relative, and then gives part of his property to that relative. There is a telling of the tale of Shunahshepa, a boy who was nearly sacrificed to Varuna on behalf of the sonless king Harishchandra. Also included is a game of throwing dice with the Adhvaryu priest in which the king wins a cow, by which the king is enthroned and the cosmos is regenerated. The Shatapatha Brahmana states that the rajasuya was the means by which a Kshatriya may become a king, and is not suitable for Brahmanas.

Historically, the rajasuya was performed by the Indo-Aryan kings, which led to the expansion of their kingdoms during the Iron Age. The kings of Tamilakam performed the rajasuya, attended by monarchs of Lanka. Kharavela, the king of Kalinga, is described to have performed the rajasuya, despite being a Jain. The Satavahana kings performed the ceremony. The sacrifice was performed by kings throughout the subcontinent, recorded to have been performed in South India at least until the time of the Vijayanagara Empire.

See also
 Rājyābhiṣeka
 Ashvamedha

References

External links 

 

Sacrifice
Mahabharata
Hindu rituals
Yajna